Dale Hargens was a Democratic member of the South Dakota House of Representatives, representing the 22nd district from 2001 to 2009. He was Minority Leader in his final term.

External links
South Dakota Legislature – Dale Hargens official SD House website

Project Vote Smart – Representative Dale E. Hargens (SD) profile
Follow the Money – Dale E Hargens
2006 2004 2002 2000 House campaign contributions
2008 Senate campaign contributions

Democratic Party members of the South Dakota House of Representatives
People from Miller, South Dakota
1954 births
Living people